Scott Anderson James McCulloch (born 29 November 1975 in Cumnock) is a Scottish former footballer.

References

External links

1975 births
Living people
Scottish footballers
Rangers F.C. players
Hamilton Academical F.C. players
Dunfermline Athletic F.C. players
Dundee United F.C. players
Cardiff City F.C. players
Airdrieonians F.C. (1878) players
Forfar Athletic F.C. players
Brechin City F.C. players
Ayr United F.C. players
Partick Thistle F.C. players
Stenhousemuir F.C. players
Scottish Football League players
Scottish Premier League players
Footballers from East Ayrshire
People from Cumnock
Association football defenders